East Central High School is one of nine high schools in Tulsa Public Schools in Tulsa, Oklahoma.  The school is home to 1,143 students from East Tulsa. The majority of students transition into East Central from:  East Central Junior High.

History 
East Central was founded in 1904 as an independent school district. The original combined school was built on the northeast corner of what is now Admiral Blvd. and Garnett Road in 1927 that supported an elementary school, a junior high school, and high school. With the growth of the East Central district, the school built an expansion to house the High School in 1955 and built a new Elementary school on East 6th street that was completed in November 1958.  In 1960 considerable damage to the high school facility at the Admiral Blvd location by high wind and school start was delayed a week. In the summer of 1964 the people of the district voted to be annexed into the Tulsa Public Schools starting that school year ('64/'65).  The current school facility opened in 1966 on East 11th Street, with addition of an athletic Stadium in 1997. The architect of the landmark Rose Bowl bowling alley on 11th Street (old Route 66), William Henry Ryan, also designed East Central High School. Beginning in the 2009–2010 school year, uniforms are required for freshman students for the first time in the school and district history.

Music Program 
School Superintendent William Wickett hired Frank McPeters to start the school's first band program in 1951. Within a few short years, the ECHS Band was performing at a high level in school concerts, area parades and at ECHS football games. "Mister Mac" was loved by his students, and was known for his remarkable ability to motivate young people to become high achievers. He was an outstanding musician, serving as the principal trombonist for the Tulsa Philharmonic Orchestra for over 30 years. He will long be remembered by his many students. Frank was inducted into the East Central High School Hall of Fame in the 1990s.

Athletics 
East Central competes in Oklahoma 5A athletics. Sports teams compete as the East Central Fighting Cardinals (The football team is also known by The Sharks). During the 2005–2006 school year, the football team, girls basketball team, and girls track team won the state 5A title in their respective sports. The East Central Girls basketball team won consecutive State 5A titles in 2006 and 2007. The girls track team won two more consecutive titles for school years 2006–2007, and 2007–2008, for a total of three.  The Boys Track team also won the 5A State title in 2008 and in 2011. East Central has several different sports including soccer, football, basketball, tennis, golf, baseball, track, and wrestling.

Notable alumni

Anthony Bowie - 1982, NBA Basketball Player
Mark Calvert - 1974, MLB Baseball Player, San Francisco Giants (1983-1984)
Tony Casillas - 1981, NFL Football Player and broadcaster
Jimbo Elrod - 1972, NFL Football Player Linebacker, Kansas City Chiefs (1976-1978), Houston Oilers (1979)
Gerald Harris- 1998, UFC Mixed Martial Arts Fighter
Jim Shoulders - 1945, Professional Rodeo Cowboy
Paula Trickey - 1984, Film and Television actress

Media Appearances
East Central High School has been featured on TruTV's The Principal's Office.

References

External links 
 

Public high schools in Oklahoma
Educational institutions established in 1927
1927 establishments in Oklahoma
Tulsa Public Schools schools